The Tata Steel Chess Tournament 2020 was the 82nd edition of the Tata Steel Chess Tournament. It was held in Wijk aan Zee from 10–26 January 2020. The tournament was won by Fabiano Caruana.

Results

Results by round

Crosstable 
{| class="wikitable" style="text-align: center;"
|+82nd Tata Steel Masters, 10–26 January 2020, Wijk aan Zee — Eindhoven, Netherlands, Category XX (2741)
! !! Player !! Rating !! 1 !! 2 !! 3 !! 4 !! 5 !! 6 !! 7 !! 8 !! 9 !! 10 !! 11 !! 12 !! 13 !! 14 !! Total !! SB !! TPR
|-
|-style="background:#ccffcc;"
| 1 || align="left" ||| 2822||
| ½
|½
|½
|1
|½
|1
|1
|1
|½
|1
|½
|1
|1
|10
|
|2945
|-
| 2 || align="left" ||| 2872
| ½||  
|½
|½
|½
|½
|½
|½
|1
|½
|½
|1
|½
|1
|8
|
|2818
|-
| 3 || align="left" ||| 2765
|½
| ½||  
| ½
|½
|½
|1
|½
|1
|½
|½
|½
|½
|½
|7½
|
|2796
|-
| 4 || align="left" ||| 2644
|½
|½
| ½||  
| 1
|½
|½
|½
|½
|0
|0
|1
| 1
|½
|7
|44.25
|2777
|-
| 5 || align="left" ||| 2683
|0
|½
|½
|0||  
|½
| ½
|½
|½
|½
|1
|½
|1
|1
|7
|40.75
|2774
|-
| 6 || align="left" ||| 2768
|½
|½
|½
|½
|½||  
|½
|½
|0
|½
|½
|½
|½
|1
|6½
|41.00
|2739
|-
| 7 || align="left" ||| 2758
|0
|½
|0
|½
| ½
|½||  
|½
|1
| 1
|½
|½
|½
|½
|6½
|39.75
|2739
|-
| 8 || align="left" ||| 2758
| 0
| ½
|½
|½
|½
|½
|½||  
|½
| ½
|½
|½
|1
|½
|6½
|39.50
|2739
|-
| 9 || align="left" ||| 2723
|0
|0
|0
|½
|½
| 1
|0
| ½ ||  
| 1
|1
|½
|½
|1
|6½
|37.50
|2742
|-
| 10 || align="left" ||| 2712
|½
|½
|½
|1
| ½
|½
|0
|½
| 0||  
|1
|½
|½
|0
|6
|40.50
|2714
|-
| 11 || align="left" ||| 2731
|0
|½
|½
|1
|0
|½
|½
|½
|0
|0||  
|1
|½
|1
|6
|35.75
|2712
|-
| 12 || align="left" ||| 2747
|½
|0
|½
|0
|½
|½
|½
|½
|½
|½
| 0||  
|½
|½
|5
|
|2653
|-
| 13 || align="left" ||| 2726
|0
|½
|½
|0
|0
|½
|½
|0
|½
|½
|½
|½||  
|½
|4½
|
|2632
|-
| 14 || align="left" ||| 2660
|0
|0
|½
|½
|0
|0
|½
|½
|0
|1
|0
| ½
|½||  
|4
|
|2606
|}

{| class="wikitable" style="text-align: center;"
|+2020 Tata Steel Challengers, 10–26 January 2020, Wijk aan Zee, Netherlands, Category XV (2602)
! !! Player !! Rating !! 1 !! 2 !! 3 !! 4 !! 5 !! 6 !! 7 !! 8 !! 9 !! 10 !! 11 !! 12 !! 13 !! 14 !! Total !! SB  !! TPR
|-
| 1 || align="left" | || 2694 ||  || ½ || 1 || ½ || ½ || ½ || 1 || ½ || 1 || 1 || ½ || 0 || 1 || ½ || 8½ ||  || 2705
|-
| 2 || align="left" | || 2635 || ½ ||  || ½ || ½ || ½ || 1 || ½ || 1 || ½ || 0 || ½ || 1 || 1 || ½ || 8 || 49.75 || 2686
|-
| 3 || align="left" | || 2650 || 0 || ½ ||  || ½ || 1 || 1 || ½ || ½ || ½ || ½ || ½ || 1 || 1 || ½ || 8 || 49.00 || 2685
|-
| 4 || align="left" | || 2606 || ½ || ½ || ½ ||  || ½ || ½ || ½ || ½ || ½ || ½ || 1 || ½ || 1 || 1 || 8 || 48.25 || 2689
|-
| 5 || align="left" | || 2636 || ½ || ½ || 0 || ½ ||  || ½ || ½ || ½ || ½ || ½ || ½ || 1 || 1 || 1 || 7½ || || 2656
|-
| 6 || align="left" | || 2527 || ½ || 0 || 0 || ½ || ½ ||  || ½ || ½ || 1 || 1 || ½ || ½ || ½ || 1 || 7 || 41.75 || 2637
|-
| 7 || align="left" | || 2618 || 0 || ½ || ½ || ½ || ½ || ½ ||  || 0 || ½ || ½ || 1 || 1 || ½ || 1 || 7 || 41.25 || 2630 
|-
| 8 || align="left" |  || 2523 || ½ || 0 || ½ || ½ || ½ || ½ || 1 ||  || 0 || ½ || ½ || ½ || ½ || 1 || 6½ || 40.00 || 2608
|-
| 9 || align="left" | || 2673 || 0 || ½ || ½ || ½ || ½ || 0 || ½ || 1 ||  || ½ || 0 || 1 || ½ || 1 || 6½ || 38.50 || 2596
|-
| 10 || align="left" | || 2585 || 0 || 1 || ½ || ½ || ½ || 0 || ½ || ½ || ½ ||  || 1 || 0 || ½ || ½ || 6 || 39.50 || 2574 
|-
| 11 || align="left" | || 2659 || ½ || ½ || ½ || 0 || ½ || ½ || 0 || ½ || 1 || 0 ||  || 1 || ½ || ½ || 6 || 37.50 || 2569
|- 
| 12 || align="left" | || 2498 || 1 || 0 || 0 || ½ || 0 || ½ || 0 || ½ || 0 || 1 || 0 ||  || ½ || ½ ||4½ || 29.00 || 2500
|-
| 13 || align="left" | || 2604 || 0 || 0 || 0 || 0 || 0 || ½ || ½ || ½ || ½ || ½ || ½ || ½ ||  || 1 || 4½ || 24.75 || 2492
|-
| 14 || align="left" | || 2519 || ½ || ½ || ½ || 0 || 0 || 0 || 0 || 0 || 0 || ½ || ½ || ½ || 0 ||  || 3 || || 2397
|}

References

External links 

 Website Tata Steel 2020

Tata Steel Chess Tournament
2020 in chess
2020 in Dutch sport